The Mediterranean grenadier (Coryphaenoides mediterraneus) is a species of deep-sea fish in the family Macrouridae.

Description
The head is scaled except for its gular and branchiostegal membranes; it has a blunt snout. Its brain shows increased volume in the octavolateral area (premotor organization of body movements) and gustatory area (taste); this is unsurprising as it lives in near-total darkness and is dependent on chemosensory inputs to find prey.

Habitat

Behaviour
The Mediterranean grenadier feeds on small benthic invertebrates. They exhibit a cycle of daily activity, because the solar cycle influences the movement of pelagic prey who move vertically during the day. They are parasitised by many species of cestode worms.

References

Macrouridae
Fish described in 1893
Taxa named by Enrico Hillyer Giglioli